Ya'ara Saks  (born March 9, 1973) is a Canadian politician who was elected to the House of Commons of Canada in a by-election on October 26, 2020, following the resignation of Michael Levitt. She represents the riding of York Centre as a member of the Liberal Party of Canada.

Early life
A dual citizen of Canada and of Israel, Saks was born in Toronto to an Israeli father and has lived in both Israel (1995 to 2006) and Canada. She attended McGill University for her undergraduate education, and then completed her Master's degree in international relations and diplomacy at the Hebrew University of Jerusalem. Before entering politics, Saks owned a yoga studio in York Centre (in the north end of Toronto) and was the director of Trauma Practice for Healthy Communities, a charity that focuses on mental health.

Views on Israeli Politics

Saks has been deeply critical of the direction of the Netanyahu government in Israel for its treatment of its Israeli Arab citizens and the 2018 Nation-State law  and has expressed the concern that it is leading Israel to be "deeply racist towards its minorities and ... not to see itself as a light and shelter or future home to asylum seekers fleeing war," as well as its elevation of leadership at the expense of the justice system.

Despite her differences with the Likud government, Saks has stated that she is "an unapologetic Zionist who believes passionately in the State of Israel" and that she condemns the BDS Movement (boycott, divestment and sanctions against Israel), considering it antisemitic.

Canadian Federal politics

Saks won the 2020 York Centre federal by-election as a member of the Liberal Party of Canada.

Upon being sworn in as a member of Canada's House of Commons (along with fellow rookie parliamentarian Marci Ien) it took the number of female MPs in Canada to 100, which, at 30%, is the highest proportion of women in that chamber in its history.

In February 2022, when speaking in the House about confirming the Emergencies Act in response to the "Freedom Convoy" protest, Saks claimed that "honk honk" (a phrase used by convoy supporters in reference to truck horns) was "an acronym for 'heil Hitler'". Saks provided evidence for her claim on Twitter, citing antifascist researcher and organizer Gwen Snyder, who posted a 4chan post that promoted using the claim as a prank  similar to the site's previous hoax that the "OK" hand gesture was code for “white power”.

Electoral record

References

External links

1973 births
Living people
Liberal Party of Canada MPs
Canadian people of Israeli descent
McGill University alumni
Members of the House of Commons of Canada from Ontario
People from North York
Politicians from Toronto
Women members of the House of Commons of Canada
Jewish Canadian politicians
21st-century Canadian women politicians
Canadian Zionists